The Federal University of Lafia formerly named Federal University, Lafia is a recently established university situated in Lafia, the capital of Nasarawa State, this was done in 2010 by the Goodluck Jonathan administration as one of the nine new federal universities established in the six geo-political zones of Nigeria.

The university commenced academic activities by September 2012 with new students that made up the first set of students to be trained by the University Vice Chancellor, Prof. Ekanem Ikpi Braide. 
Federal University, Lafia currently has a third Vice Chancellor Prof. Shehu Abdulrahaman, who was appointed by the present President of the Federal Republic of Nigeria, Major General Muhammadu Buhari, GCFR (RTD). The appointment takes effect from the 11th of February 2021, after the expiration of the tenure of Prof. Muhammad Sanusi Liman.

Site 
Initially, the university was to be sited along Jos road in Lafia metropolis and it was meant to begin operation using the facilities of the College of Agriculture in Lafia, however, the university's temporary site was changed to Obi road outside Lafia metropolis. In 2015, the university began relocating to its permanent location on 206 hectares of land provided by the Nasarawa State Government along the Lafia-Markudi Road in Lafia. By 2018, the central administration and the majority of faculties had successfully relocated to the university's permanent site, with the exception of two faculties. The university has an intranet for its own use.

Faculties and departments
Presently, she has more than three faculties and over twenty six departments. This includes the following:

New departments were created by the university and accredited by the National Universities Commission, NUC. The new departments include Medicine and Surgery (MBBS), geography, philosophy, and Mass Communication among others.

References 

Federal universities of Nigeria
Technological universities in Nigeria
Nasarawa State
Educational institutions established in 2010
2010 establishments in Nigeria